Taunton Flower Show is an annual flower show held in Vivary Park, Taunton, Somerset, England. It has been described as "The Chelsea of the West", and attracts around 17,000 visitors over its two days.

Description
The show was first held in 1831 and apart from during the Second World War, has been held every year since. The history of the show is documented in a book by Anne Leamon, a current Vice Chairman, and cited as the 'Longest running Show in country'  There has been controversy in 2017 when Taunton Deane Borough Council decided to impose a rental on the Taunton Flower Show for the use of Vivary Park which put a question mark over its future on the site  but at present the Flower Show is remaining at Vivary Park whilst continuing to revue its budgets.
The Chairman Adrian Prior-Sankey has been awarded the MBE in 2018 "for service to the community of Taunton"

References

External links

 

Flower show
Flower shows
Gardening in England
Events in Somerset
1831 establishments in England
Recurring events established in 1831